The 2012–13 season is FK Partizan's 7th season in Serbian SuperLiga. This article shows player statistics and all matches (official and friendly) that the club have and will play during the 2012–13 season.

Players

Squad information

Squad statistics

Starting 11

Top scorers
Includes all competitive matches. The list is sorted by shirt number when total goals are equal.

Transfers

In

Out

For recent transfers, see List of Serbian football transfers summer 2012 and List of Serbian football transfers winter 2012–13.

Competitions

Overview

Serbian SuperLiga

League table

Results and positions by round

Matches

Serbian Cup

UEFA Champions League

Qualifying phase

UEFA Europa League

Play-off round

Group

Friendlies

Sponsors

See also
 List of FK Partizan seasons

References

External links
 Official website 
 Partizanopedia 2012-13  (in Serbian)

FK Partizan seasons
Partizan
Partizan
Partizan
Serbian football championship-winning seasons